Rudy Eka Priyambada is an Indonesian football head coach who currently coaches Indonesia women's national football team.

Coaching career
On 20 January 2021, Rudy was officially appointed by PSSI as head coach of the Indonesia women's national football team

References

External links

1982 births
Living people
People from Jakarta
Sportspeople from Jakarta
Indonesian football managers
Association football coaches
Women's national association football team managers